Arthur "Snowy" Retell (22 January 1906 – 13 June 1978) was an Australian rules footballer who played for South Fremantle in the West Australian Football League (WAFL) and St Kilda in the Victorian Football League (VFL).

Family
The son of Paulus Retel (1873-1918),  and Susan Ellen Retell (1866-1940), née Rickard, Arthur Retell was born at Albany, Western Australia on 22 January 1906.

He married Murielle Louisa Webb (1908-) on 11 June 1927. He married for a second time in 1942; his second wife was Millicent Jessie Andrew (1910-1993).

Football

South Fremantle (WAFL)
He played for the South Fremantle Football Club in the West Australian Football League. from 1929 to 1933. He represented Western Australia at the 1933 ANFC Carnival in Sydney.

St Kilda (VFL)
In 1934, Retell moved to St Kilda where he was given employment. He was refused a transfer, and stood out of football for a year.

In 1935 he was granted a clearance, and played 8 games with the St Kilda First XVIII, scoring 8 goals, and the rest of the season with the Second XVIII. In 1936 he was taken off the senior list, and was appointed coach of the St Kilda Second XVIII.

Military service
Retell later served in the Australian Army during World War II.

Death
He died at Myaree, Western Australia on 13 June 1978.

Notes

References
 
 Interstate Honours, The Albany Advertiser, (Thursday, 8 August 1929), p.4.
 
 World War Two Service Record: Lance Corporal Arthur Retell (VX66958), National Archives of Australia.

External links 

Arthur Retell's playing statistics from WAFL Footy Facts

1906 births
1978 deaths
Australian rules footballers from Western Australia
St Kilda Football Club players
South Fremantle Football Club players
Australian Army personnel of World War II
Australian Army soldiers